Contrafacia is a genus of Neotropical butterflies in the family Lycaenidae.

Species
Contrafacia bassania (Hewitson, 1868) Mexico
Contrafacia marmoris (Druce, 1907) Colombia, Venezuela
Contrafacia ahola (Hewitson, 1867) Mexico, Venezuela, Colombia, Ecuador
Contrafacia imma (Prittwitz, 1865) Mexico, Guatemala, Surinam, French Guiana, Venezuela, Colombia, Ecuador, Brazil, Paraguay, Argentina
Contrafacia francis (Weeks, 1901) Bolivia, Argentina
Contrafacia muattina (Schaus, 1902) Brazil

References

Eumaeini
Lycaenidae of South America
Lycaenidae genera